Battle Lines is the second album by Canadian electronic music duo Bob Moses, released on September 14, 2018, via Domino Recording Company.

Critical reception
The music review website Pitchfork gave the album a rating of 5.8 out of 10, describing it as "tasteful to a fault, joining gentle electronics with polite indie rock and vaguely wistful lyrics."

Track listing

References

2018 albums